The National Highway 155 or the N-155 is a part of the Pakistan National Highway running from Larkana to the town of Moenjo Daro in Sindh province of Pakistan. Its total length is 28 km, and is maintained and operated by Pakistan's National Highway Authority.

See also

References

External links
 National Highway Authority

Roads in Pakistan